Transport in Cardiff, capital and most populous city in Wales involves road, rail, bus, water and air. It is a major city of the United Kingdom and a centre of employment, government, retail, business, culture, media, sport and higher education.

Welsh Government statistics for 2008/09 showed that Cardiff had the lowest percentage of the population who travelled to work by car, van or minibus, suggesting the highest public transport usage to work out of all 22 local authorities in Wales.

Between 2008 and 2009, car and taxi usage dropped from 59.7% to 52.3%, while walking was up by 1.4% to 18.3%. For bus usage, the figure had risen by 3% to 15.5% and cycling use increased from 1.6% to 7.4%. Train usage also rose from 3.8% to 4.7% over the same period.

Road
The M4 motorway connects Cardiff to towns and other cities in Britain. To the east: Newport, Bristol, Bath, Swindon, Reading and terminating at London. To the west: Bridgend, Swansea, Llanelli and terminating near Carmarthen. It is part of the unsigned European route E30. Cardiff can be accessed directly from junctions 29 – 34 inclusive:

Junctions

The A48(M) motorway connects Junction 29 to the city centre with exits for the Cardiff suburbs of St. Mellons (westbound only), where it becomes the A48, Pontprennau (M4 junction 30 via the A4232), Pentwyn, Rumney, Llanedeyrn and also for the University Hospital of Wales.

 
The A4232 (also known as the Peripheral Distributor Road) connects M4 junction 33 with junction 30 by bypassing through the south of the city.  From junction 33, exits are at Culverhouse Cross Interchange, Leckwith Interchange, Ferry Road Interchange (for Barry and Penarth) and Butetown, the road ends at Queen's Gate Roundabout, where the long-awaited Eastern Bay Link Road will eventually link with the Southern Way Link Road.  It then goes onto the M4 at junction 30 via the A48 (Eastern Avenue) and the Pentwyn Link Road (A4232).

The A470 road is the main North – South Wales route running from Cardiff Bay to Llandudno via exits for the suburbs of Tongwynlais and Taff's Well. The A470 is a major road within the city that provides an important link with the Heads of the Valleys road, Mid and North Wales.

As with many other cities car traffic has caused congestion problems and as such the council has designated bus lanes to improve transport into and out of the city centre. The Welsh Assembly Government is considering the introduction of variable congestion charging in the city centre, but only once there has been significant investment in the city's public transport network.

There are several road and rail bridges that cross the River Taff in Cardiff. These include the Clarence Road Bridge, a comparatively modern bridge which replaced a swing bridge. The original bridge was named after the Duke of Clarence.

Much of Cardiff's central shopping zone is pedestrianised, and further pedestrianisation is planned as part of the current St David's 2 regeneration scheme.

Rail

The largest stations in Cardiff (and Wales) are Cardiff Central and Cardiff Queen Street which over 10 million people use each year. They are both operated by Transport for Wales and controlled by ticket barriers.

National

Cardiff Central is the 10th busiest station in the United Kingdom outside London with eight platforms. Cardiff Central is situated on the South Wales Main Line providing national services while Cardiff Queen Street station is the hub of the Valley Lines suburban rail network (See Below).

Central station provides regular services to London Paddington via Bristol Parkway, with other links to Swansea and West Wales on the South Wales Main Line while other national services connect Cardiff with Bristol Temple Meads, Birmingham New Street, Nottingham, Manchester Piccadilly, Southampton Central and Portsmouth Harbour.

Improvements to the north-south Wales rail networkwere  introduced in 2010 and there are now services every two hours that connect Wrexham General, Llandudno and Holyhead in North Wales to Cardiff in the south.

Suburban rail

Cardiff has an urban rail metro network operated by Transport for Wales known as Valley Lines. With Cardiff Central and Queen Street as the hubs, it connects Cardiff's northern, southern and western suburbs to the city centre. There are eight lines that connect Central and Queen Street stations to 20 smaller stations in the city, 26 in the wider urban area (including Taffs Well, Penarth and Dinas Powys) and more than 60 in the South Wales valleys and the Vale of Glamorgan. The council is investigating converting the Cardiff City Line, Coryton Line and Butetown Branch Line into light rail lines and extending them in the near future.

Bus

Cardiff has a comprehensive bus network, with council-owned Cardiff Bus providing the vast majority of routes in the city and as well as Newport, Penarth, Barry, Cardiff Airport and Llantwit Major. Stagecoach South Wales, Edwards Coaches and EST Buses also provide services in the city.

National
Stand B at Central station is used for services to destinations outside Cardiff and the Vale such as TrawsCambria X40 to Aberystwyth, Shuttle 100 to Swansea, Stagecoach services to the Valleys and all National Express services (e.g. Birmingham, London, Leeds).

The Megabus service to London, and to Newcastle via Birmingham, Manchester and Leeds stops outside Cardiff Castle on Castle Street.

Local
Cardiff Bus used stands B, C, D, E, F and W at Central station and Wood Street, until the closure of Cardiff Central bus station in 2015 and the redevelopment of Central Square. Other bus stops in the city are located in Westgate Street, St. Mary Street, Castle Street, Kingsway, Greyfriars Road, Dumfries Place and Queen Street Station. Cardiff Bus operates a comprehensive Overground network. Work on the new transport interchange to replace the Cardiff Central bus station began in January 2008, though construction did not begin until 2020.

Cardiff Bus has introduced articulated buses on the popular 17 and 18 Capital City Red routes to Canton, Ely and Caerau and on the Baycar route. Other notable routes include the Capital City Green, four park & ride services and the now-withdrawn Free b shuttle bus.

Park and ride

There are four Park and Ride services in the city: 
Cardiff West Park and Ride is based at the Cardiff City Stadium at Leckwith.
Cardiff South Park and Ride operates from County Hall in Cardiff Bay.
Cardiff North Park and Ride operates at Crown Way, off North Road between Gabalfa and Cathays.
Cardiff East, which is the newest Park and Ride after opening in late 2009, runs to Queen Street station from Pentwyn.

The new park and ride is part of Cardiff council's Sustainable Travel City initiative, which is partly funded by the Welsh Assembly Government. There are plans to extend the number of space from 340 to 1,100 due to its sudden increase in usage.

Cycling

Cycling in Cardiff is facilitated by its easy gradients and large parks. In 2005, 4.3% of people commuted to work by cycling, compared to 2% in London and 5% in Berlin.  However, cyclists in the city appear to be influenced by deterrents to cycling and as a result will need a greater level of improved facilities to increase cycling numbers, according to research by Cardiff University.

There are 3 major off-road cycle routes in Cardiff, each following a major river in the city. The Taff Trail follows the River Taff south to north from Cardiff Bay, through the City Centre, Maindy, Llandaff, Radyr and Tongwynlais towards Brecon. The Ely Trail follows the River Ely west to east from St Fagans through Fairwater, Leckwith and Grangetown to Cardiff Bay. This route is connected to Penarth via Pont y Werin cyclist bridge. The Rhymney Trail follows the River Rhymney east to west in Pentwyn and Llanrumney.

Water

The Aquabus runs every hour between the city centre (Taff Mead Embankment) and Cardiff Bay (Mermaid Quay), and between Cardiff Bay and Penarth (Cardiff Bay barrage). Throughout the year Cardiff Waterbus
sail between the Pierhead on Cardiff's Waterfront and the Penarth end of the Cardiff Bay Barrage with short sightseeing cruises. Between March and October boats also depart from Cardiff Bay to take visitors to Flat Holm Island. The Paddle Steamer Waverley and MV Balmoral sail from Britannia Quay (in Roath Basin) to various destinations in the Bristol Channel.

Air

Cardiff, as well as South and West Wales, is served by Cardiff Airport (CWL). Scheduled, charter, and low-cost flights are operated on a regular basis to Anglesey, other UK destinations, Europe, Africa and North America all year round.

It is located at Rhoose, south west of the city and has a dedicated railway station at Rhoose Cardiff International Airport railway station and is linked by bus to Cardiff Central bus station.

The Cardiff Heliport was the main operating base of police support services, and could also handle passenger traffic. It closed on 30 November 2014.

Plans
There are a number of plans in Cardiff to help facilitate traffic into the city centre and reduce chronic congestion that has plagued the city in recent years. The main city centre thoroughfare, St. Mary's Street, was closed to private vehicles in 2007.

Road
Construction began on 17 March 2016 on the  Eastern Bay Link Road (A4232) which will run from the Queen's Gate Roundabout to the Rover Way – Lamby Way Roundabout on the Southern Way Link Road, although at present only the first phase between Queen's Gate Roundabout and Ocean Way Interchange. This will complete the outer ring road and will help to reduce congestion in the city centre.

Rail and light rail
There are plans to open more railway stations on existing lines to encourage more people to leave their cars at home and help reduce city centre congestion. Services on the Merthyr Line doubled to two per hour and a new rail service began on 6 February 2008 on the Ebbw Valley Railway. Further improved frequencies with Pontypridd and Caerphilly to 7 per hour and 5 per hour respectively are expected.

Also of note is the long-held plan to introduce a light rail line connecting Cardiff Bay. However it is likely to have been shelved due to rising costs. 

A new out of town parkway-style station with 3,500 parking spaces has been proposed.

References

External links

 
Transport in Wales